Nemba Airport is an airport in Rwanda.

Location
Nemba Airport  is located in Rwanda's Eastern Province, in Bugesera District, in the town of Nemba, at the International border with Republic of Burundi.

The geographic coordinates of this airport are 2° 19' 48.00"S, 30° 12' 0.00"E (Latitude:-2.33000; Longitude:30.20000).

Overview
Nemba  Airport is a small rural airport that serves the town of Nemba and neighbouring communities. It is one of the eight public civilian airports under the administration of the Rwanda Civil Aviation Authority.

External links
Website of Rwanda Civil Aviation Authority

See also
 Nemba
 Bugesera District
 Eastern Province, Rwanda
 Rwanda Civil Aviation Authority

References

Bugesera District
Eastern Province, Rwanda
Airports in Rwanda